"Steal Away" is a song by American singer Robbie Dupree, from his 1980 debut album Robbie Dupree. Released as the first single from the album, it became his biggest hit, peaking at No. 6 on the U.S. Billboard Hot 100 and No. 5 on the Adult Contemporary chart.  In Canada, the song reached No. 14 on the Pop chart and spent three weeks at No. 2 on the Adult Contemporary chart.

In 2009, VH1 ranked  "Steal Away" placed at No. 64 on their retrospective list 100 Greatest One-Hit Wonders of the 80s. This is despite Dupree having had a second top 40 hit with his No. 15-peaking single "Hot Rod Hearts".

History and song information
The song was released by Dupree in 1980. It immediately charted in the top 20, becoming a big hit during the summer of 1980 and the driving force on his debut album. John D'Agostino of the Los Angeles Times described the song as "a blatant, wimpy rip-off of the Michael McDonald/Kenny Loggins' composition "What a Fool Believes". The Washington Post noted similarities in both Dupree's vocal style and backing keyboards to "What A Fool Believes", mentioning that McDonald's publishers sought legal action, although McDonald himself did not accuse Dupree of stealing his song.

In 2017, the song was used in the American television crime drama series, Better Call Saul, in season 3, episode 10, titled "Lantern."

Chart performance

Weekly charts

Year-end charts

References

External links
 

1980 debut singles
Robbie Dupree songs
1980 songs
Elektra Records singles